Bletchley Rugby Union Club is an English rugby union club from Milton Keynes who play at Manor Fields. They routinely put out three Senior XVs, a ladies side and a Vets side. The 1st XV play in Berks/Bucks & Oxon Premier and the 2nd XVs in the Berks/Bucks & Oxon 2 North table. The 3rd XV and Vets side play ad hoc friendly local fixtures. Bletchley Ladies is a developing team which is intending to enter the RFUW leagues in the 2011 season.

In addition to the 120+ adult section, the club has a Youth (U7s to U17s) set-up with over 200 members. In the 2005/06 season the club's U17 squad were Buckinghamshire County Cup champions, and finalists in the South West Division Bowl. The playing activities at Bletchley are supported by a large number of volunteers, including the 50+ Vice-Presidents of whom many are ex-players. Bletchley celebrated its 60th anniversary during the 2007/08 season.

History
In 2003 Bletchley RUFC were the first sports organisation in Milton Keynes/North Bucks to gain the Rugby Football Union 'Seal of Approval' and Sport England Clubmark. In 2006 the club gained Stage 2 accreditation from the same bodies.

Club Honours
1st Team:
 Bucks Cup winners: 1983-84, 1984-85
Berks/Bucks & Oxon 2 champions: 2002–03
Berks/Bucks & Oxon 1 champions: 2003–04
Southern Counties North champions (2): 2006–07, 2013–14

2nd Team:
Berks/Bucks & Oxon 1 North champions: 2006–07
Berks/Bucks & Oxon 2 North champions: 2010–11

See also
English rugby union system

References

English rugby union teams
Rugby union in Buckinghamshire
Sport in Milton Keynes